The Nuclear South Bird's Head, Core South Bird's Head or East South Bird's Head languages form a small language family of western New Guinea. They either form part of a wider South Bird's Head language family, or may be an independent language family if not related to the Inanwatan and Konda–Yahadian languages.

Languages
There are six languages:

 East South Bird's Head
 Kais (Kampong Baru)
 Iwaro–Kaburi
 Kaburi
 Puragi (Iwaro)
 Kokoda–Arandai
 Kokoda (Tarof, Kasuweri)
Arandai
 Kemberano (Weriagar, Barau)
 Dombano (Tomu)

Proto-language
Some lexical reconstructions by Usher (2020) are:

{| class="wikitable sortable"
! gloss !! Proto-East South Bird's Head
|-
| body hair/feather || *karar
|-
| ear || *qer[aw]
|-
| nose || *mitob
|-
| tooth || *resin
|-
| tongue || *nun
|-
| foot/leg || *sor
|-
| blood || *a[m/p]as
|-
| bone || *toq
|-
| breast || *did
|-
| louse || *kon
|-
| bird || *kanen
|-
| egg || *wuk
|-
| tree || *qemin
|-
| man || *rabin
|-
| sun || *teg[ed]
|-
| moon || *mo[k/q]
|-
| water || *sai
|-
| path || *aum
|-
| one || *onat
|-
| two || *[ou]g
|}

References

External links 
 Timothy Usher, New Guinea World, Proto–East South Bird's Head

 
Nuclear
Languages of western New Guinea